The Pakistani cricket team toured Scotland from 17 May to 19 May 2013. The tour consisted of two One Day Internationals (ODIs).

Squads

ODI series

1st ODI

2nd ODI

References

2013
2013 in Pakistani cricket
International cricket competitions in 2013